Rudolf Bastiaan "Rudy" Andeweg (born 28 February 1952) is a former Professor of Empirical Political Science at Leiden University. He has written on political psychology, voting behavior, political elites, political leadership, comparative politics and political institutions.

Andeweg was born in Leiden, he studied law at Leiden University and graduated in 1975, and he obtained an MA in political science at the University of Michigan the next year. In 1982 he earned his PhD from Leiden University, he became professor of political science six years later. Andeweg was a fellow at the Netherlands Institute for Advanced Study in the Humanities and Social Sciences (NIAS) between 2002 and 2003.

Andeweg became member of the Royal Netherlands Academy of Arts and Sciences in 2006.

Decorations
  
  Officer in the Order of Orange-Nassau

References

External links
 Profile at NARCIS

1952 births
Living people
Dutch political scientists
Leiden University alumni
Academic staff of Leiden University
Members of the Royal Netherlands Academy of Arts and Sciences
Officers of the Order of Orange-Nassau
People from Leiden
University of Michigan College of Literature, Science, and the Arts alumni